The women's road time trial H1–3 road cycling event at the 2020 Summer Paralympics took place on 31 August 2021, at Fuji Speedway, Tokyo. 11 riders competed in the event.

The event covers the following three classifications, that all use hand-operated bicycles:
H1: tetraplegics with severe upper limb impairment to the C6 vertebra.
H2: tetraplegics with minor upper limb impairment from C7 thru T3.
H3: paraplegics with impairment from T4 thru T10.

Results
The event took place on 31 August 2021, at 10:35:

References

Women's road time trial H1-3